The EuroLeague Basketball 2010–20 All-Decade Team consisted of 10 basketball players that were awarded and named to the EuroLeague's All-Decade Team, in recognition of the second decade of the league's competition under the organization of Euroleague Basketball, between the years 2010 and 2020.

EuroLeague 2010–20 All-Decade Team nominees 

There were 50 nominated players for the All-Decade Team. Voting included votes from selected media members and fans, as well as the league's 18 current (at the moment) head coaches and 18 current (at the moment) team-captains.
(Players listed in bold were selected to the All-Decade Team)

The All-Decade Team by vote
The EuroLeague 2010–20 All-Decade Team was decided by a vote of EuroLeague head coaches, EuroLeague players, sports journalists that cover the EuroLeague, and fans. The All-Decade Team players were announced one by one, in the ascending order by which they finished in the vote tally.

The EuroLeague 2010–20 All Decade Team

See also
EuroLeague
EuroLeague Awards
EuroLeague 2000–10 All-Decade Team
50 Greatest EuroLeague Contributors (2008)
EuroLeague Legends

References

External links
EuroLeague official website
EuroLeague 2010–20 nominees official Page

2010-20 All-Decade Team